William James Humphry (5 November 1814 – 30 September 1865) was an English cricketer. Humphry's batting and bowling styles are unknown. He was born at Lavant, Sussex.

Humphry made his first-class debut for Petworth against Hampshire at Petworth Park New Ground in 1845. He played two further first-class matches for Petworth in 1845, against the Marylebone Cricket Club at Petworth Park New Ground, and a return fixture against Hampshire at Day's Ground, Southampton. In that same season he also made a single first-class appearance for the Gentleman against the Players at the Royal New Ground, Brighton. His next first-class appearance came in 1848, when he made his first-class debut for Sussex against the Marylebone Cricket Club at Lord's. He made seven further first-class appearances for the county, the last of which came against a United All-England Eleven at the Dripping Pan, Lewes, in 1854. He also made a single first-class appearance each for the Gentlemen of England against a United England Eleven in 1853, and for the Surrey Club against the Marylebone Cricket Club in 1855. In total, he made fourteen first-class appearances, scoring a total of 175 runs at an average of 8.33, with a high score of 30. With the ball, he took three wickets, all of which came for Petworth in their second match against Hampshire in 1845. Humphry took figures of 3/2 from two overs.

He died at Donnington, Sussex, on 30 September 1865. His brother, George, also played first-class cricket.

References

External links
William Humphry at ESPNcricinfo
William Humphry at CricketArchive

1814 births
1865 deaths
People from Lavant, West Sussex
English cricketers
Petworth cricketers
Gentlemen cricketers
Sussex cricketers
Surrey Club cricketers
English cricketers of 1826 to 1863
Gentlemen of England cricketers